Vassall ward is an administrative division of the London Borough of Lambeth, United Kingdom. It is also known as 'Myatt's Field' when informally describing the area. It is located in the North of borough bordering Southwark, in the SW9 and SE5 postcode area. The area is named after Henry Vassall-Fox, 3rd Baron Holland who was responsible for the first building development in the area in the 1820s.

The ward is made up of mostly Brixton but includes parts of Stockwell, Camberwell, Oval and a very small part of Kennington. The ward is noted for its high numbers of households living in deprived conditions. Housing stock in the ward ranges from large detached houses to towerblocks—ONS figures show that over 61% of housing in the ward is rented from the local authority or from a housing association with many people living on large housing estates such as the Myatts Fields North, Myatts Fields South, Cowley, Holland Town and Caldwell Gardens estate.  The ward contains several open spaces and parks including Myatt's Fields Park, Eythorne Park and Slade Gardens. It also contains the churches of St John the Divine, Kennington and Christ Church Brixton Road. At the 2011 Census the population of the ward was 14,143.

Vassall ward is located in the Lambeth and Southwark London assembly constituency and is represented by Labour Co-op Member Florence Eshalomi. It is in the Vauxhall parliamentary constituency and is one of four wards in the borough's north Lambeth division.

Lambeth Council elections 2018 
The 2018 Lambeth council elections took place on Thursday May 3, 2018 with three councillors to be elected.

Former residents of Vassall ward
Artist Vincent van Gogh briefly lived in Hackford Road in Vassall ward. Other famous former Vassall inhabitants include Prime Minister John Major who lived in Burton Road, music hall artist Dan Leno and landscape painter David Cox.

References

External links
Lambeth Borough Council profile for the ward
Lambeth map of the ward
Vassall ward election results on lambeth website
Vassall View Vassall Ward website with local news and information and details of Vassall Labour Party  
Vassall and Oval ward map and information from 1918

Wards of the London Borough of Lambeth